Emily Wilson (born 26 August 2001) is a Northern Irish footballer who plays as a forward for Crusaders Strikers and the Northern Ireland national team.

Playing career

Club

Crusaders Strikers F.C., 2018–
Since 2018, Wilson has played for Crusaders Strikers F.C. in Northern Ireland's Women's Premiership, the top women's league in the country.
She was named the league's Player of the Month for November 2020.

International
Wilson has represented Northern Ireland on the under-17, under-19, and senior national teams. She made her debut for the Northern Ireland national team during a match against Belarus on 27 November 2020, starting the match.

Honors
 Women's Premiership Player of the Month: November 2020

Personal life
Wilson grew up in Antrim and attended Parkhall College.

References

External links
 Profile at UEFA.com
 Profile at Northern Ireland Football League
 

2001 births
Living people
Women's association football forwards
Women's association footballers from Northern Ireland
Northern Ireland women's international footballers
Women's Premiership (Northern Ireland) players
People from Antrim, County Antrim
UEFA Women's Euro 2022 players